Hyposmocoma nihoa is a species of moth of the family Cosmopterigidae. It is endemic to Nihoa, Northwestern Hawaiian Islands. The type locality is Miller Canyon.

The wingspan is 6.3–7.6 mm.

The larval case is burrito-shaped and 3.4–4.8 mm in length. It is large and rounded with a curved pointed distal end and decorated with lichens woven with silk filaments. The case background color ranges from green to gray.

Adults were reared from case-making larvae. Larvae were collected on small bushes and rocks.

References

nihoa
Endemic moths of Hawaii
Endemic fauna of Nihoa
Moths described in 2009